This is a List of stadiums in Nigeria by capacity. It also includes the current team in each stadium. Onikan Stadium, Lagos is the oldest stadium in Nigeria.

List

References

External links
 

 

Nigeria
Stadiums